Giovanni Carmazzi (born April 14, 1977) is a former American football quarterback who played in the National Football League (NFL) for two seasons with the San Francisco 49ers. He played college football at Hofstra University, where he threw for over 9,000 yards, and was selected by the 49ers in the third round of the 2000 NFL Draft. Carmazzi spent the entirety of his NFL career as a backup, never appearing in a regular season game. After being released by the 49ers, he spent one season in NFL Europe and two seasons in the Canadian Football League (CFL).

Professional career 

Carmazzi was selected by the San Francisco 49ers 65th overall in the third round of the 2000 NFL Draft and was the second quarterback taken. He was also one of six drafted before Michigan quarterback Tom Brady, who would become one of the league's most decorated players. Against the Brady-led New England Patriots in the 2000 Pro Football Hall of Fame Game, Carmazzi struggled, completing only 3 of 7 passes for 19 yards in a 20–0 loss. Carmazzi also spent time with the Rhein Fire of NFL Europe in 2001 and appeared briefly on the Canadian Football League (CFL) rosters of the BC Lions and Calgary Stampeders in 2004 and 2005, respectively.

In a 2011 ESPN documentary about the six quarterbacks taken before Brady, it was revealed that Carmazzi was then living in northern California as a farmer, yoga practitioner, and an owner of five goats. It was also reported that he did not own a television.

Recognition 
Carmazzi was a 1999 National Football Foundation National Scholar-Athlete while playing at Hofstra University, a 1996 high school scholar-athlete honoree awarded by the Sacramento Chapter and a 1996 West Region High School Scholar-Athlete of the Year. He is one of only four all-time NFF awardees in all three of these categories.

References

External links
Just Sports Stats

1977 births
Living people
Players of American football from Sacramento, California
Players of Canadian football from Sacramento, California
American football quarterbacks
Hofstra Pride football players
San Francisco 49ers players
Rhein Fire players
American players of Canadian football
Canadian football quarterbacks
BC Lions players
Calgary Stampeders players
American expatriate sportspeople in Germany